Franz-Josef Beerenbrock (9 April 1920 – 13 December 2004) was a German fighter pilot during World War II. He was a recipient of the Knight's Cross of the Iron Cross with Oak Leaves. Beerenbrock was credited with 117 aerial victories in approximately 400 combat missions, all on the Eastern Front. In November 1942 he became a prisoner of war for the rest of the war.

World War II
Beerenbrock, the son of a Russian mother, joined a flak artillery unit on 1 October 1938 and in 1939 was trained as a pilot. In March 1941, Beerenbrock was transferred to 12. Staffel (12th squadron) of Jagdgeschwader 51 (JG 51—51st Fighter Wing), a squadron of IV. Gruppe (4th group). At the time, IV. Gruppe of JG 51 was based in Le Touquet, France on the English Channel fighting the Royal Air Force. During this period, the Gruppe was being reequipped with the Messerschmitt Bf 109 F series. Beerenbock's commanding officers were, Major Friedrich Beckh as Gruppenkommandeur (group commander) and the Staffelkapitän (squadron leader) of 12. Staffel was Oberleutnant Karl-Gottfried Nordmann. On 16 April, the Gruppe moved to an airfield at Marquise.

Operation Barbarossa
IV. Gruppe of JG 51 was withdrawn from the Channel Front in early June 1941 and ordered to Mönchengladbach where the unit was equipped with a full complement of Bf 109 F-1 and F-2 aircraft. On 15 June, IV. On 22 June, German forces launched Operation Barbarossa, the German invasion of the Soviet Union. JG 51, under the command of Oberstleutnant Werner Mölders, was subordinated to II. Fliegerkorps (2nd Air Corps), which as part of Luftflotte 2 (Air Fleet 2). JG 51 area of operation during Operation Barbarossa was over the right flank of Army Group Center in the combat area of the 2nd Panzer Group as well as the 4th Army.

Beerenbrock claimed his first aerial victory on 24 June 1941 over a Tupolev SB-2 bomber. He frequently flew as wingman of Nordmann and Heinrich Bär. Following his 42nd aerial victory, Beerenbrock was awarded the Knight's Cross of the Iron Cross on 6 October 1941.

Eastern Front

On 30 July 1942, during the Battle of Rzhev, the Soviet Kalinin Front launched an attack against the 9th Army on the northern flank of the Rzhev salient. The Soviet 29th and 30th Army breached the German front between the German 87th and 256th Division. The next day, III. and IV. Gruppe of JG 51 were sent to intercept strong forces of Ilyushin Il-2 ground-attack aircraft attacking German ground forces. On 1 August 1942, he became an "ace-in-a-day" claiming nine aerial victories on three combat missions, including his 100th overall. He was the 15th Luftwaffe pilot to achieve the century mark. At that point, he was the most successful fighter pilot of JG 51 and the first pilot of JG 51 to surpass Werner Mölders. He was awarded the Knight's Cross of the Iron Cross with Oak Leaves on 3 August 1942. Beerenbrock and together with Hauptmann Anton Hackl were presented the Oak Leaves by Adolf Hitler at the Führerhauptquartier at Rastenburg.

In October 1942, Beerenbrock was appointed Staffelkapitän (squadron leader) of 10. Staffel (3rd squadron) of JG 51. In consequence, he was taken prisoner of war.

Summary of career

Aerial victory claims
According to US historian David T. Zabecki, Beerenbrock was credited with 117 aerial victories. Spick also lists Beerenbrock with 117 aerial victories claimed in over 500 combat missions, all but one on the Eastern Front. Mathews and Foreman, authors of Luftwaffe Aces — Biographies and Victory Claims, researched the German Federal Archives and found records for 111 aerial victory claims, all of which claimed on the Eastern Front.

Victory claims were logged to a map-reference (PQ = Planquadrat), for example "PQ 56432". These sectors were then subdivided into 36 smaller units to give a location area 3 × 4 km in size.

Awards
 Iron Cross (1939)
 2nd Class (3 July 1941)
 1st Class (18 July 1941)
 Honour Goblet of the Luftwaffe on 15 September 1941 as Unteroffizier in a Jagdgeschwader
 German Cross in Gold on 17 June 1942 as Feldwebel in the IV./Jagdgeschwader 51
 Knight's Cross of the Iron Cross with Oak Leaves
 Knight's Cross on 6 October 1941 as Unteroffizier and pilot in the 10./Jagdgeschwader 51
 108th Oak Leaves on 3 August 1942 as Oberfeldwebel and pilot in the 10./Jagdgeschwader 51 "Mölders"

Notes

References

Citations

Bibliography

 
 
 
 
 
 
 
 
 
 
 
 
 
 
 
 
 
 
 
 

1920 births
2004 deaths
People from Datteln
Luftwaffe pilots
German World War II flying aces
People from the Province of Westphalia
Recipients of the Gold German Cross
Recipients of the Knight's Cross of the Iron Cross with Oak Leaves
German prisoners of war in World War II held by the Soviet Union
Military personnel from North Rhine-Westphalia